Dwight Craig Horn (born May 9, 1944) is a former Republican member of the North Carolina House of Representatives. He represented the 68th district (containing parts of Union County) from 2011 until 2021. Afterwards, he was elected mayor of Weddington.

Electoral history

2021

2020

2018

2016

2014

2012

2010

References

Living people
1944 births
People from Davenport, Iowa
People from Weddington, North Carolina
21st-century American politicians
Members of the North Carolina House of Representatives
North Carolina Republicans